Rose Hill is a  hamlet in a rural area of the town of Marcellus in Onondaga County, New York, United States, along Rose Hill Road.  It is marked by a sign where the road climbs a hill and is included on maps.

Hamlets in Onondaga County, New York
Hamlets in New York (state)